The Body is a novella by American writer Stephen King. The Body was published in King's 1982 collection Different Seasons and later adapted into the 1986 film Stand by Me.

The story takes place during the summer of 1960 in the fictional town of Castle Rock, Maine. After a boy disappears and is presumed dead, twelve-year-old Gordie LaChance and his three friends set out to find his body along the railway tracks. During the course of their journey, the boys, who all come from abusive or dysfunctional families, come to grips with death and the harsh truths of growing up in a small factory town that does not seem to offer them much of a future.

Plot
Gordon "Gordie" LaChance reminisces about his childhood in Castle Rock, Maine. At that time, Gordie's elder brother Dennis, whom his parents favored, had recently died, leaving Gordie's parents too depressed to pay much attention to him. In 1960, Gordie and his three friends − Chris Chambers, Teddy Duchamp and Vern Tessio − learn that a gang of hooligans led by John "Ace" Merrill have accidentally discovered the dead body of a missing boy named Ray Brower, who was hit by a train. Because the gang found the body while driving a stolen car, they elected not to report the body to the police. The boys get the idea to find the body "officially" so that they may become famous. In preparation for the expedition, Chris steals a gun from his father, and the boys camp out in a nearby field.

Over the course of the narrative, the adult Gordie recalls his first published story, Stud City, about the life of a simple man named Edward "Chico" May whose older brother also died. He has a girlfriend, Jane, who he does not have particularly strong feelings for. Chico knows that his stepmother Virginia slept with his brother before he died, but he hesitates to tell his father about it. One day, Chico has a fight with his father over Virginia and leaves the house.

Along the way, the boys trespass at the town dump and are chased by Chopper, the dump custodian Milo Pressman's dog. Teddy gets into a verbal skirmish with Milo when the latter insults Teddy's father by calling him a "loonie". Gordie and Vern are nearly run over by a train while crossing a trestle. While at a resting point, Gordie tells his friends another story, "The Revenge of Lard-Ass Hogan", in which the titular Davie "Lard-Ass" Hogan exacts vengeance on the town locals for ridiculing his wide girth by downing a whole bottle of castor oil before engaging in the town's annual pie-eating contest and vomiting on the previous year's champion, which causes a chain reaction that nauseates the entire audience. The next morning, the boys stumble upon a small pond and partake in a swim, but jump out in horror when they find that the pond is teeming with leeches.

After a thunderstorm, the boys finally find the dead body. The body of Ray Brower was discovered to be mangled by the train, in which it was Ray's attempt to escape the locomotive's path. Ace's gang arrives shortly after. During an argument, Chris pulls the gun on the gang and forces them to leave, but Ace promises reprisals. Tired, depressed and fearing retaliation, the boys decide there is nothing more to be done with the body and return home. Subsequently, one of the gang members reports the body as an anonymous tip, and the gang members severely beat all four boys. The four friends eventually drift apart, but Gordie and Chris remain close. Chris decides to prepare for higher education, and with Gordie's support, they both graduate from the University of Maine. In the present day, Gordie tells how he learned of Chris's death after he was fatally stabbed while trying to stop an argument in a restaurant, about the deaths of Vern and Teddy (in a house fire and car accident respectively), about his successful writing career, and about his recent visit to Castle Rock, where he found that Ace has become an alcoholic and ordinary worker.

Accusation of plagiarism
In Lisa Rogak's unauthorized biography Haunted Heart: The Life and Times of Stephen King, a friend of King's, George McLeod, claimed that King had cribbed the idea for The Body from a short story McLeod had been working on, but these claims are disputed by King. McLeod requested a portion of the royalties from The Body and Stand by Me; King refused. McLeod sued, which ended their friendship. Since then, King has refused his fans' requests to read their manuscripts for advice; King has explained that he is concerned that there may be further accusations of plagiarism.

See also
 Stephen King short fiction bibliography

References

1982 American novels
American novellas
American novels adapted into films
Novellas by Stephen King
Novels about friendship
Novels about bullying
Novels involved in plagiarism controversies
Novels set in Maine